Oleksandr Mykhailovych Batyuk (born 14 January 1960) is a former Soviet cross-country skier who competed in the 1980s, training at Dynamo in Chernihiv. He won a silver in the 4 × 10 km relay at the 1984 Winter Olympics in Sarajevo. He is a member of the Ski Federation of Ukraine and the only Olympian of the federation who received medal at Olympics.

Batyuk also won two medals in the 4 × 10 km relay at the FIS Nordic World Ski Championships with a gold in 1982 (tied with Norway) and a silver in 1987.

His best individual finish was sixth twice in the World Cup (1984, 1986).

He was born in Chernihiv, Soviet Union.

Cross-country skiing results
All results are sourced from the International Ski Federation (FIS).

Olympic Games
 1 medal – (1 silver)

World Championships
 2 medals – (1 gold, 1 silver)

World Cup

Season standings

Team podiums
 1 victory
 4 podiums

Note:  Until the 1999 World Championships and the 1994 Winter Olympics, World Championship and Olympic races were included in the World Cup scoring system.

References

External links
 
 
 

1960 births
Living people
Sportspeople from Chernihiv
Olympic cross-country skiers of the Soviet Union
Soviet male cross-country skiers
Dynamo sports society athletes
Cross-country skiers at the 1984 Winter Olympics
Cross-country skiers at the 1988 Winter Olympics
Olympic silver medalists for the Soviet Union
Olympic medalists in cross-country skiing
FIS Nordic World Ski Championships medalists in cross-country skiing
Medalists at the 1984 Winter Olympics